Caution World Tour was the eleventh concert tour by American singer Mariah Carey. The tour consisted mostly of theaters and small to midsize arenas, with 35 dates including shows in North America, Europe, the Caribbean, and the Middle East and was in support of Carey's fifteenth studio album Caution. The tour failed to translate into sales of the album as the album sold approximately 80,000 copies globally, becoming Carey's lowest selling studio album. The tour was met with good reviews from some music critics.

Background and development 
Carey's fifteenth studio album, titled Caution, was released on November 16, 2018 and received universal acclaim from critics. The album was described as a "fine-tuning" of Carey's previous work, and was praised for its freshness which made it "pleasingly defiant", with some critics hailing it as being "the new blueprint for legacy acts" of Carey's stature. By December 2018, the album had been featured on several year-end lists. Prior to the album's release, dates were announced for both the North American and European leg of the tour, teasing it as being her "most intimate tour yet".

The opening leg of the tour was performed in small, theatre-based venues across North America. It kicked off on February 27, 2019 in Irving, Texas and concluded on April 6 in Bethlehem, Pennsylvania. The European leg of the tour was mainly arena-based, with Carey opening on May 22 in Dublin and finishing on June 13 in Amsterdam.

Following this, Carey performed at several festivals including the Festival d'été de Québec at the Plains of Abraham, Canada, where the singer performed in front of an audience of over 90,000 people, and the Curaçao North Sea Jazz Festival.

Set list 
This set list is representative of the April 6, 2019, show in Bethlehem, Pennsylvania. It may not represent all dates of the tour.

 "A No No"
 "Dreamlover"
 "You Don't Know What to Do" / "Emotions"
 "Anytime You Need a Friend"
 "Can't Take That Away (Mariah's Theme)" / "Fantasy"
 "Always Be My Baby"
 "Caution"
 "GTFO"
 "Stay Long Love You"
 "My All"
 "Love Takes Time"
 "Never Too Far" / "Last Night a DJ Saved My Life" / "Loverboy" / "Didn't Mean to Turn You On"
 "Heartbreaker"
 "Touch My Body"
 "We Belong Together"
 "Hero"

Critical reception

Although the tour consisted mostly of theaters and small to midsize arenas, many of the dates did not sell out. However, the tour was met with some good reviews from some music critics. In a review for AJC, Melissa Ruggieri concluded that the Carey had "resumed her live prowess', describing it as being "a commendable feat nearly 30 years into a career and one worth cheering". Similarly, Stefan Kyriazis from Express gave the show 5 stars, stating: "She was hitting the high trills, the low growls, and all those iconic whistle notes were popping off all over the stage..."

Carey most notably garnered attention for her three-day residency at the Royal Albert Hall in London. She was praised for both her vocal ability and overall stage presence. Michael Cragg from The Guardian described Carey's "incredible, playful performances" as a testament to her status as a "gold-plated pop diva". Similarly, Kate Solomon from The Daily Telegraph stated the shows were "a surreal but wildly enjoyable showcase of a brighter, more fun side of the pop icon". In a review for The Arts Desk, Sebastian Scotney stated Carey "delivers and the audience delivers back". During her concert in Dublin, Louise Bruton from The Irish Times stated: "She takes us through three decades of hits, from soul-searching ballads to chart-topping songs that bring in pop hooks, hip-hop beats, R&B melodies that show off every side of the singer that we’ve come to know over the years". Rosa Diaz from 20 minutos also gave a positive review from her concert in Barcelona, citing Carey's "powerful presence, who reviewed her greatest hits alternated with some songs from her new album, showing her vocal ability and knowing how to be on stage".

Tour dates

Cancelled shows

References

Notes

Citations 

2019 concert tours
Mariah Carey concert tours